La Mulera is located in Juan Vicente Gómez Parish, in the municipality of Bolívar, of the state of Táchira, in Venezuela.

It is the birthplace of Juan Vicente Gómez.

References

Populated places in Táchira